Alaya Brigui is a Tunisian footballer who plays as a midfielder, most recently for Saudi Arabian club Al-Okhdood. He made his debut for the Tunisia national football team in 2012.

On 13 January 2022, Brigui joined Saudi Arabian club Al-Okhdood.

References

Living people
1992 births
Tunisian footballers
Tunisia international footballers
Tunisian Ligue Professionnelle 1 players
Saudi First Division League players
Étoile Sportive du Sahel players
US Ben Guerdane players
Al-Okhdood Club players
Association football midfielders
Tunisian expatriate sportspeople in Saudi Arabia
Expatriate footballers in Saudi Arabia